Thai coconut pudding may refer to several Thai desserts:
 Khanom thuai
 Khanom khrok
 Coconut jam, known in Thai as sangkhaya